Reč is a small town in the municipality of Ulcinj, southeastern Montenegro.Reč is mentioned in 1413 in the Scutarias taxable income part of the Albanian (arbanas) katun (semi-nomadic pastoral community) of Gjon Kereçi (Kereçi in the original) In recent times, many locals have migrated, notably to the United States. The area is a prime site for agricultural land, hunting, and fishing.

Reč is divided into two sections:
Reč
Kodre Dakaj

Family names

Djonovic,
Dukagjini,
Dushaj,
Gazivoda,
Gjoni / Gjonaj,
Kina / Kinic,
Mirdita,
Selca / Selcanin,
Shabani,
Zadrima,
Zagreda,
Lotaj.

Demographics
The population of Reč between 1948 and 2003 was as follows:
1948 – 221
1953 – 275  
1961 – 317
1981 – 336
1991 – 291
2003 – 117

According to the 2011 census, its population was 61.

See also

  http://www.buzuku.info/Arkivi/Buzuku%2020/Informat.htm    Familja e Noc Matisë Gjergj Simonit-(Gjonaj)
  http://www.visit-ulcinj.com/blog/2012/09/28/gjonajt-e-reciterdhen-emigrante-e-u-bene-milionere-ne-amerike/   Gjonajt e Reçit
  http://www.visit-ulcinj.com/blog/2013/09/25/cifti-ejll-dhe-age-zagreda-kremtoi-70-vjetorin-e-marteses/   Çifti Ejll dhe Age Zagreda
  http://www.buzuku.info/Arkivi/Buzuku09/M%C3%ABrgimi_2.htm   Na morën tokën e na dhanë pasaportën
  https://www.academia.edu/33718705/AKADEMIA_E_SHKENCAVE_E_REPUBUKES_TE_SHQIPERISE Scutarias taxable income

References

Populated places in Ulcinj Municipality
Albanian communities in Montenegro